The blue mbuna (Labeotropheus fuelleborni) is a species of cichlid found in Lake Malawi where it inhabits areas with rocky substrates.  This species can reach a length of  SL.  This species is important to local commercial fisheries as well as being found in the aquarium trade.  Some of its mottled forms are sometimes known as marmalade cat.

The specific name honours the German parasitologist and military physician Friedrich Fülleborn (1866-1933).

See also
List of freshwater aquarium fish species

References

Labeotropheus
Fish described in 1926
Fish of Lake Malawi
Taxa named by Ernst Ahl
Taxonomy articles created by Polbot